Suresh Kashinath Taware is a member of the 15th Lok Sabha of India. He represents the Bhiwandi constituency of Maharashtra and is a member of the Indian National Congress (INC) political party.

References

Living people
Indian National Congress politicians
India MPs 2009–2014
Marathi politicians
Lok Sabha members from Maharashtra
People from Bhiwandi
Politics of Thane district
Year of birth missing (living people)
Indian National Congress politicians from Maharashtra